The tenth season of the series Show Me the Money (known as Show Me the Money 10: The Original) premiered on October 1, 2021. It was broadcast every Friday at 23:00 (KST) on Mnet. The season featured four new producer teams Yumdda and Toil, Gaeko and Code Kunst, Gray and Mino, and Zion.T and Slom.

This season saw approximately 27,000 applicants, the most in the show's history. The increase in number of contestants joining the show was due to the financial difficulties most rappers faced due to the COVID-19 pandemic. With the lack of in-person concerts, events, and gigs, most of them began to focus on online streaming and web-content platforms which provide minimal income.

This season will also be a "10th Anniversary Project" that crosses broadcasting, online and Over The Top platforms under the concept of "The Original", celebrating the show's rich history of serving as a forefront of the Korean Hip-hop scene, as well as showcasing the emergence of up and coming Korean artists who joined the show.

The winner of this season is Jo Gwang-il, with Team Gaeko x Code Kunst as the winning producer team. He will receive a prize money of ₩300,000,000, plus a Mini Cooper, album production support and a 1-month stay in an ultra-luxury hotel suite.

Judges 
Team Yumdda x Toil
 Yumdda: Rapper and Co-founder of the recently established Daytona Entertainment. Member of hip-hop collective Back N' Forth.
 Toil: Producer under Daytona Entertainment. Member of Wayside Town Crew. 

Team Gaeko x Code Kunst
 Gaeko: Co-founder of Amoeba Culture and one half of the hip-hop group Dynamic Duo. Previously participated in season 6 and 9 as a producer/judge for Teams Dynamic Duo and DyWhy respectively.
 Code Kunst: Music producer signed under AOMG, formerly signed under the defunct HIGHGRND. He was a judge/producer in seasons 777 and 9 for Team CodePalo.

Team Gray x Mino
 Gray: Rapper and producer under AOMG. Previously participated in season 5, where he was one of the winning producers of Team AOMG. Member of VV:D crew with Team Zion.T x Slom producer Zion.T.
 Mino: Rapper and member of the K-Pop group Winner under YG Entertainment. Previously participated in season 4 under his real name Song Min-ho, where he finished first runner-up under Team ZiPal. 

Team Zion.T x Slom
 Zion.T: Singer and producer under The Black Label. He was a judge/producer in season 5 with Team YG, and in season 9 where he was one of the winning producers for Team Zion.T x Giriboy. Member of Holocoin with fellow Producer/Judge Slom, and VV:D crew with Team Gray x Mino producer Gray.
 Slom: Independent producer. Member of Holocoin with fellow Producer/Judge Zion.T. He had co-produced most of Team Zion.T X Giriboy's discography in season 9. Previously signed under Halftime Records.

Teams
The final Producer Team line-ups were formed during the Team Rapper Casting round, in which five members per team were selected. 

Team Zion T x Slom (also known as Team Tsla)
 Sokodomo - Member of Eumcha1ld. Signed under Sony Music. Previously participated in season 777, and in season 3 of High School Rapper under his real name Yang Seung-ho.
 Don Mills - Rapper signed under VMC (Vismajor Company).
 Khakii - Signed under Wavy. Previously participated in season 9 as a member of Team Code Kunst x Paloalto.
 Northfacegawd - Signed under Starex Records. Formerly known by his rapper name Bredy when he started his rap career. 
 A-Chess - Member of SP1B crew. Participated in all the previous seasons, but started advancing further than the Rapper Evaluation Round from season 7. 

Team Gray x Mino (also known as Team Graynoma)
 Be'O - Signed under FameUs Entertainment. Previously participated in seasons 777 and 9, and in the third season of High School Rapper under his real name Yoo Chan-wook. 
 Mudd the Student - Member of musical collective Balming Tiger.
 Anandelight - Christian rapper. Signed under Hadash Music.
 Geegooin - Member of Hip-hop trio Rhythm Power, who are co-CEOs of their own label Team Player. Formerly an artist of Amoeba Culture. Previously participated in season 4 as a member of Team AOMG, and in season 6.
 Unofficialboyy - Member of Team D.O.G. (Drug Online Gate). Rapper and ex-leader of Dickids crew and member of XXYXNAF crew. Signed under Ackermann. Previously participated in seasons 4, 5 and 7, season 8 as a preliminary member of Team BGM-v, in season 9, and the first season of High School Rapper. Also known by his rap names Luda, Trapstarsureen, and Baddie Homie, and through his real name Lee Su-rin.

Team Gaeko x Code Kunst (also known as Team CoKo)
 Jo Gwang-il - Rapper signed under Dippin' Carls Records. Known as one of the fastest Korean rappers, alongside Outsider. Was nominated for Rookie of the Year at the 2021 Korean Hip-hop Awards.
 Since - Independent rapper. She was invited by VMC (Vismajor) CEO Deepflow to sign to their company. Member of VAT crew. Winner of season 2 Openmicswg freestyle challenge. Previously participated in seasons 777 and 9.
 Tabber - Signed under Dean's label you.will.knovv. 
 Ourealgoat - Signed under FDT. Previously participated in season 9.
 Ahn Byeong-woong - Signed under Wavy. Previously participated in seasons 8 as a preliminary member of 40-Crew and season 9 as a member of Team Code Kunst x Paloalto.

Team Yumdda x Toil (also known as Team Tonawayum)
 Koonta - Korean reggae artist signed under Sajah Records. One half of the collaboration group Rude Paper.
 Basick - Veteran rapper and CEO under his own label Outlive Records. Winner of season 4 as a member of Team Brand New Music. Previously a member of hip hop crew Jiggy Fellaz and duo Double Trouble with season 4 semifinalist Innovator.
 365lit -  Member of UnderSeongsuBridge (USB) crew. Previously participated in season 9 as a member of Team Code Kunst x Paloalto.
 Hwang Ji-sang - Independent rapper. Also known by his rapper name H-Venom.
 Song Min-young - The youngest contestant to join this season at 13 years old (Korean age).

Rounds

Round one: rapper selection round 
After sending in their audition clips, those selected by the production crew will attend the rapper selection round. As a safety precaution from the COVID-19 pandemic, the contestants will be divided into small groups, with each contestant socially distanced from one another, and have a plexiglass placed between him/her and the assigned producer. Each contestant will perform a short a cappella rap in front of the producer. The producer then provide an in-depth evaluation of the contestant, and determine if they advanced to the next round. Unlike the previous seasons where the producer typically hand the SMTM neck chain to the contestant, the contestant will grab the chain at the corner of the plexiglass. 132 contestants advanced into the next round.

Notable contestants from the rapper selection round

 Received the SMTM necklace from one of the SMTM producers and will advance to the next round. 
 Eliminated from the show

Round two: 60-second beat rap
The remaining 132 contestants will participate in the 60-second beat rap, where each contestant must do a one minute rap in front of all judges. At least one producer team has to pass the contestant in order to progress to the next round. This season will also incorporate the use of augmented reality (AR) to emphasize on the contestants who received an "all pass" or "all fail" status. If the contestant receives an "All Pass", the stage will virtually go up, signifying his/her continuation to the next round. Conversely, contestants receiving an "all fail", are eliminated from the show and must surrender their SMTM necklace by throwing it to the virtual fire. At the end of the round, the producers will select eight memorable contestants that failed the round for the Revival round. They will perform the a cappella version of their 60-second rap performance in front of the Producers and will decide whether to revive the contestant or not. A total of 56 contestants (51 contestants that passed this round, five contestants were revived) advanced to the next round.

Notable contestants at the 60-Second Beat Rap

Selected rappers in the revival round

 Received a "pass" or "all pass" from the producer team(s). 
 Received a "fail" from producer team(s). If the contestant received an "all fail", they were eliminated from the show.

Round three: 1-on-1 battle
The remaining 56 contestants will be paired up for the 1-on-1 battle. Prior to this round, contestants with an "all pass" received a "top" sticker, while those with 2 or 3 passes received a "middle" sticker, those with 1 pass received a "bottom" sticker, and those that were revived from the revival round received a "brink of elimination" sticker. MC Kim Jin-pyo then presented cards representing one contestant. When picked, the contestant will choose his/her partner. They will perform in front of the producer teams with a beat or song from the producer teams. After the performance, the producer teams will evaluate their performance. The winning contestant will advance to the next round and gets to choose the producer team he/she will join. The losing contestant will get a chance to be revived via "producer pass" where at least one of the producer teams may decide to let the contestant advance to the next round and make him/her choose the team he/she wants to join. If neither of the producer teams press the "producer pass" button after 10 seconds, the losing contestant is eliminated from the show. In case of a tie, a sudden-death tie-breaker will be performed, where both contestants will once again prepare a set performance using another producer beat or song to determine the winner. If the first sudden death tie-breaker still ends in a tie, another round of sudden-death tie-breaker will be held, this time both contestants will pick another producer beat or song and perform it on the spot. If both contestants still end up in a tie after two sudden death tie-breakers, one of the producer teams must give one or both contestants the "producer pass" to advance into the next round. A total of 33 contestants advanced to the next round.

 Indicates the winning contestant and advances to the next round
 Received a "Producer Pass" and advanced to the next round.
 Eliminated from the show after the producers did not use the "Producer Pass"

Round four: producer performances and team rapper casting
The remaining 33 contestants will undergo team casting in order to be matched by the producer team he/she wants to join in. Prior to this round, the producers will have special performances to convince them to join their teams. The contestant will vote for the best performance. The winning producer team will get to pick their first contestant to join their team. Each contestant will then make one last appeal by doing a set performance in front of the producers in order to convince their desired producer team to accept him/her. The contestants then will each have three minutes to listen to each producer team's appeal to join their team and then decide which producer team room he/she will enter. Each producer team will call in the contestants in their producer team room and will select contestants that will form their 5-member team. The remaining contestants that were not called in may still have a chance to be picked by another producer team if their team does not have 5 members. If neither producer team picks the contestant, he/she is eliminated from the show.

 Indicates the producer team who receive the most votes from the contestants and will have a chance to pick the first contestant to join their team.
- The Italicized performance was performed for the first time and was released in all music platforms the next day

Rapper Appeal Performance + Team Casting

 Indicates the contestants who were picked to join a team.
 Indicates the contestants who were eliminated from the show after not being picked to join a team.

Round five: team song mission
Prior to this round, the producer teams meet up for their team bonding session to get to know their team members and to introduce the instrumental in which their members will write their lyrics and then perform in front of all the producer teams. At the end of each performance, the producers of the performing producer team will eliminate one contestant. Unlike previous seasons, the eliminated contestant will still be part of the official release version of the song and will be included in this season's discography.

 Eliminated from the show. The contestant will still be part of the official release version of the song and will be included in this season's discography.

Round six: team diss battle
At the end of the team song mission, Team Gaeko x Code Kunst, who finished last in the producer stage performances, gets to choose the producer team they will face in this round, while the remaining two producer teams will face each other. There will be one-on-one diss battles for this round with previously eliminated contestants serving as members of the audience. They will vote after each diss battle with the votes accumulated to determine the winning producer team. The losing producer team will have its producers eliminate 1 contestant, while the winning producer team will have all members advance to the next round.

 Indicates the winning team, with all its contestants advancing to the next round.
 Indicates the winning contestant.
 Eliminated from the show.

Round seven: first live performances
Following the results of the team diss battles, winning teams will compete against each other and losing teams will compete against each other at the live performances. This season, there will not be a mic selection and all remaining contestants perform in this round. However, the "Death Match Rule" will be applied in which two contestants will perform together but one of them will be eliminated regardless if they win or lose their respective match-ups. The performance voting will also involve the live audience and online audiences who registered a week prior to the recording of the show. The winning producer team from the previous round will select two contestants that will perform together in the Death Match with the Producer(s) and/or special guest performer, while the other two contestants will have solo performances with the producers and/or special guest performer. The losing producer team will then select two contestants that will perform together in the Death Match with the Producer(s) and/or special guest performer, while the other contestant will perform with the producers and/or special guest performer. At the end of each performance, the online audience will first eliminate one contestant on each Death Match performance regardless of the result. Both the Live and online audience will then vote for the winner of each solo and Death Match match-ups with the total number of votes will be accumulated for each Producer Team. The winning Producer Team will have its members advance to the semi-finals. The Losing Producer Team will eliminate one more contestant in either the solo performance(s) or Death Match performance(s) while its remaining members advance to the semifinals. A total of 8 contestants advance to the semifinal round. 

 Indicates the winning performance and Producer crew who will advance to the semi-final round. Only one contestant in the winning team of the death match performances will advance to the next round as voted by the online voters. 
 Eliminated from the show. The contestant in the Death Match performances was also eliminated via online voters regardless of the match-up result. The losing team in each death match performances eliminated the second contestant either in the solo performances or death match performances as the producer's decision.

Round eight: semi-final performances
The eight semi-finalists paired up for a single elimination semi-final round. Each of them had a solo performance with a special guest performer(s). Prior to this round, MC Kim Jin-pyo showed 8 cards representing one contestant. He picked the first three cards in which the contestant picked their opponent for this round while the remaining two contestants competed against each other by default. Similar to the first live performances round, the same two-round voting process from the live and online audiences will occur in this round. However, the contestant who received more performance money after two rounds of voting against their match-up advanced to the finals, while the loser gets eliminated. In the event that all contestant(s) in one producer team lost their respective match-up(s), their entire team will be eliminated from the show.

 Indicates the winning performance and will advance to the final round.
 Eliminated from the show. If all contestant(s) in one team lost their respective match-ups, their entire producer team is eliminated as well from the show.

Round nine: final performances and special performances (live episode)
The final round will be televised live with partially pre-recorded performances as per strict compliance with the COVID-19 quarantine guidelines and live announcement of results and winners based from the votes from both the live audience (on-site evaluators) (40% of the votes) and live SMS voting (60% of the votes). Prior to the final episode, the show's production team opened the registration process for live audience participants in which the participant must be at least 19 years old and show proof that they received two doses of COVID-19 vaccine and/or a negative COVID-19 PCR test result 48 hours prior to the show. The four finalists will also meet up up the night prior to the final round to determine their order of performances. The final round will be divided into two parts: the first part of the finals featured all four finalists each having a solo performance with a special guest performer(s). After all four finalists performed, a two-round voting process from both the live audience and live SMS voting will be held, and the performance ranking based on the live audience will be announced. In the second part of the finals, the four finalists will each had one last performance with the producer(s) and/or with a special guest performer(s), with the same two-round voting process and announcement of performance ranking held after the final performances.  The contestant who earned the most cumulative performance money from both the pre-finals online evaluation team voters and live SMS voters in all two performances was the season's champion, receiving a prize money of ₩300,000,000, plus a Mini Cooper, album production support and a 1-month stay in an ultra-luxury hotel suite. The final episode also included special performances between the two final rounds from both semi-finalists and season 9 producers  with their songs included in this season's official discography.

 Indicates winner of Show Me the Money 10
 Indicates the 1st runner-up
 Indicates the 2nd and 3rd runner-ups

Show Me the Money 10 Top 20

 Winner  The contestant won Show Me the Money 10.
 Runner-up  The contestant was the runner-up.
 2nd or 3rd runners-up  The contestants were either 2nd or 3rd runner-up.
 All-pass  The contestant received an all-pass in the 60-second beat rap round.
1 3 Pass  The contestant received 3 pass and 1 fail in the 60-second beat rap round.
 2 Pass  The contestant received 2 pass and 2 fails in the 60-second beat rap round.
 1 Pass  The contestant received 1 pass and 3 fails in the 60-second beat rap round.
 All fail/revived  The contestant was initially eliminated after receiving an all-fail but was revived by the producer teams and advanced to the next round.
 Won  The contestant won his/her match-up during the 1-on-1 battle round.
 Producer pass  The contestant advanced to the next round after one of the producer teams used the producer pass during the 1-on-1 battle round.
 Won  The contestant's producer team won during the team diss battle.
 Won  The contestant won his/her solo performance in the 1st live performance and semifinal round. 
 Eliminated  The contestant is eliminated from the show. The winning contestant in the death match performances is also eliminated after being voted out by the online voters. 
Picked - Indicates that the contestant was selected to be part of a producer team.

Discography

Notes

References 

2021 South Korean television seasons